Radosław Cielemęcki (born 19 February 2003) is a Polish professional footballer who plays as a midfielder for Wisła Płock.

References

External links

2003 births
Living people
Polish footballers
Association football midfielders
Poland youth international footballers
Legia Warsaw II players
Legia Warsaw players
Wisła Płock players
Ekstraklasa players
III liga players
People from Świebodzice